The Sillery Heritage Site is an area containing historic residences and institutional properties located in the Sainte-Foy–Sillery–Cap-Rouge borough of Quebec City, Quebec, Canada. It was the first of 13 declared heritage sites of the Province of Quebec, and is among the four of which are located in Quebec City. Having been called the "cradle of the French Canadian nation," the heritage site includes approximately 350 buildings along  of the Saint Lawrence River shoreline. The Sillery Heritage Site includes buildings constructed during every major period of Quebec's history, dating back to the time of New France.

Heritage designation

Heritage designation began as early as 1929, when the Jesuit House was assigned protective status.  The entire territory was officially recognized as a declared heritage site by the Government of Quebec on February 5, 1964.  The heritage site was listed on Parks Canada's administered Canadian Register of Historic Places (CRHP;, also known as Canada's Historic Places, on June 22, 2006.  The declared heritage site consists of five categorical groups of associated elements: 629 associated heritage immovable/real properties (including classified heritage immovable), nine associated movable heritage objects, 18 associated commemorative plaques, two associated groups (Society of Jesus and Société des prêtres du Séminaire de Québec), and three associated persons (General James Murray, Noël Brûlart de Sillery, and Jean-Antoine Panet).

While recognizing the visionary action taken by Quebec's Ministry of Culture, in the 1960s, by conferring historic status upon the district to protect it from suburban developers, the National Trust for Canada, a national registered charity in Canada, placed the Sillery Historic District on its Top 10 Endangered Places list, in the early 2010s, due to the approval of condominium developments which encroached upon historic religious properties in the district.  In 2015, the City of Quebec announced that it would encourage any future developers to restore historic religious structures which were no longer owned by their former communities, in exchange for the allowance to undertake development on the surrounding lands.  The city argued that some development was necessary to provide tax revenue in order to sustain the preservation of the historic district.  The Trust has subsequently removed the Sillery Historic District from its endangered list, and archived its status as a past listing, among other properties, spread across all of Canada's provinces and territories.

Historic Properties
Among the district's properties are the early 18th century Jesuit House of Sillery, 19th century workers' homes on Foulon Road ( (also known during this time period by the English language name Cove Road)) and the Sillery coast (near Saint-Michel of Sillery Church, villas built by wood barons in the 19th century, and institutional properties built at the turn of the 20th century. 

 Spencer Grange, 1328, avenue Duquet 
 Canadian Montmartre and Sanctuary of the Sacred Heart, 1669, chemin Saint-Louis
 Villa Benmore, 2071, chemin Saint-Louis
 Villa Clermont, 2211, chemin Saint-Louis
 Bignell House, 1524, côte à Gignac 
 Timmony House, 2014, rue Louis-H. Lafontaine

Bibliography

See also 
 List of historic places in Capitale-Nationale
 Sillery, Quebec City
 Mount Hermon Cemetery
 History of Quebec

References

External links 

 Images of Sillery Heritage Site properties  in the digital collections of Université Laval Library
 Historical Society of Sillery 
 Discover the Neighborhoods of Quebec City: Sillery 
 
 
 

Heritage buildings of Quebec
French colonial architecture in Canada
Buildings and structures in Quebec City
Catholic missions of New France
Sillery, Quebec City